Mahlon Newton "Mal" Duckett (December 20, 1922July 12, 2015) was an American Negro league baseball infielder. He played from 1940 to 1950, with the Philadelphia Stars and the Homestead Grays.

Duckett was primarily a second basemen, with occasional stints as third basemen.  Duckett was "a versatile infielder with a slick glove but a lightweight bat" who saw play more for his defensive talents. He served in the US Army during World War II. In 2008, Duckett was chosen in a special Negro leagues draft wherein each team in Major League Baseball drafted a surviving Negro leagues player; the Philadelphia Phillies drafted him.

Duckett died in 2015.  He was the last surviving member of the Philadelphia Stars.  Duckett is buried at Ivy Hill Cemetery in Philadelphia.

References

External links
 and Seamheads
Negro League Baseball Players Association page

1922 births
2015 deaths
Philadelphia Stars players
Homestead Grays players
Baseball players from Philadelphia
Burials at Ivy Hill Cemetery (Philadelphia)
United States Army personnel of World War II
African Americans in World War II
Baseball infielders
21st-century African-American people
African-American United States Army personnel